The  Ashland-class dock landing ship were the first class of dock landing ship of the United States Navy. They were built during World War II. A dock landing ship (hull classification LSD) is a form of auxiliary warship designed to support amphibious operations. Eight ships were built for the United States Navy and they remained in US service until the 1960s. Two of the class were sold for export overseas, with one joining the Republic of China Navy and the other the Argentinian Navy. The two transferred ships stayed in service until the 1980s. All eight ships were scrapped.

Design and description
The Ashlands were the first dock landing ships designed and constructed for the United States Navy. Though initially the American planners had no interest in the ship type, a design was developed from a British Staff Requirement which called for a ship with a floodable deck aft to operate at least two British landing craft tanks. The ship type was initially designated "tank landing carrier" (TLC). The dock landing ship was designed with the capability of moving smaller, pre-loaded amphibious warfare craft over long distances. They had a complement of 254.

The vessels were propelled by two shafts powered by two Skinner Uniflow reciprocating engines fed steam by two double boilers creating . In United States Navy service, the Ashlands were equipped with a single /38-caliber gun, two twin-mounted  guns and two quad-mounted 40 mm guns and sixteen  guns.

Amphibious capabilities
Their well deck extended three-quarters the length of the ship and measured . The stern gate that opened onto the well deck measured . The original design called for the ability to transport 16 landing craft mechanized (LCMs), with each LCM able to embark a single tank. With four TLCs a medium tank battalion (comprising 48 tanks) could be transported. Furthermore, the ships had to transport the vehicle crews, numbering 280 troops and maintain a sustained speed of 15 knots at full load to keep up with the invasion fleets. Furthermore, they could store  of fuel for the vehicles also with accommodate the crews of up to 24 vehicles in addition to a headquarters staff. Beginning in November 1943 during World War II, a deck was erected over the top of the well deck which doubled the carrying capacity of light vehicles such as trucks and DUKWs. Further additions included the installation of a mezzanine or spar deck beneath the new deck and atop the well deck to increase the carrying capacity of small vehicles again, with the decks being connected by ramps allowing for the vehicles to be driven onto the ship via the stern.

Ships in class

Construction and career
On 26 November 1941, eight LSDs were ordered for construction at the Moore Dry Dock Company yard in Oakland, California for the United States Navy. They entered service at the height of World War II and saw action in the Pacific theater, taking part in several major invasions including the battles of Saipan, Philippines, Okinawa and Iwo Jima. Following the war, the vessels were placed in reserve. During the war, the ability to transport smaller vessels such as PT boats or minesweepers and their sometimes led to criticism that the Ashland-class ships were not available for their primary jobs. Furthermore, the landing ship docks were fitted with repair shops and some acted as repair ships in forward areas. They were reactivated for the Korean War, taking part in fleet exercises. Epping Forest operated in Korean waters, taking part in minesweeping operations, the first for an LSD. In 1954, Belle Grove was part of the fleet monitoring Operation Castle, a nuclear test at Bikini Atoll and again in 1957 for Operation Hardtack I.  In 1956, Ashland was re-configured to operate six Martin P5M-2 Marlin aircraft before being taken out of service again 1957.

In 1956 White Marsh was decommissioned, but remained in active service with a civilian crew as part of the Military Sea Transportation Service (MSTS). White Marsh remained in this service until being transferred to the Taiwan. Lindenwald also saw service with the MSTS but was reacquired by the United States Navy. Belle Grove and Gunston Hall operated off the coast of South Vietnam during the Vietnam War and performed several transport missions in support of operations there. Lindenwald also took part in the landings of US troops in the Dominican Republic in 1965.

Export
Following the Korean War, the Republic of China Navy sought to expand its amphibious capability in case an opportunity arose to invade mainland China. They acquired White Marsh on 17 November 1960 on loan and renamed the ship Tung Hai and gave it the pennant number 191. The vessel was later purchased outright in May 1976 and was renamed Chung Cheng with the pennant number 639. Chung Cheng was discarded in 1988.

On 24 April 1970, Argentina purchased Gunston Hall, renaming the ship Candido de Lasala with the pennant number Q43, later B10. Candido de Lasala was used both as a landing ship dock and as a depot ship for small craft. The vessel was deleted in 1982.

Gallery

Notes

Citations

References

 
 
 
 
 
 
 
 
 
  
 

 
Ship classes of the United States Navy